The Mathias Lasele House is a historic one-story house in Lesterville, South Dakota. It was built in 1890 with sod, which was "typically the first construction material that was used by European immigrants when they arrived in Dakota Territory." It has been listed on the National Register of Historic Places since April 16, 1980.

References

		
National Register of Historic Places in Yankton County, South Dakota
Houses completed in 1890
1890 establishments in South Dakota